Qasımbəyli (also, Qasimbəyli, Kasumbegly, and Kasymbeyli) is a village and municipality in the Barda Rayon of Azerbaijan.  It has a population of 748.

References

Populated places in Barda District